This article shows the Qualifying Draw for the 2011 Western & Southern Open.

Players

Seeds

Qualifiers

Qualifying draw

First qualifier

Second qualifier

Third qualifier

Fourth qualifier

Fifth qualifier

Sixth qualifier

Seventh qualifier

References
 Qualifying Draw

Western and Southern Open Qualifying
2011 Western & Southern Open
Qualification for tennis tournaments